Richard Plant (born 16 November 1989 in Sheffield, South Yorkshire) is a British racing driver. Plant was Formula Palmer Audi champion in 2009. After taking a sabbatical from racing in 2010 due to an illness in his family, he returned to the track in 2011 to compete in the Porsche Carrera Cup Great Britain.

References

External links
 Official website
 

1989 births
Living people
English racing drivers
Sportspeople from Sheffield
Formula Palmer Audi drivers
Porsche Supercup drivers
Porsche Carrera Cup GB drivers